Hobby Express is an American retailer that sells radio-controlled aircraft, helicopters, boats and related products through catalog and Internet sales, and operates a store in Tennessee.  It was called Hobby Lobby International before changing its name in 2013 to avoid confusion with Hobby Lobby, an arts and crafts retailer embroiled in a controversial U.S. Supreme Court case.

The company was started in 1963 by James Martin. It was sold in 2003 to GenCap America and remained headquartered in Brentwood, Tennessee. In 2009, Hobby-Lobby International was sold to Mark Cleveland of Brentwood.

References

External links
 Official Site

Companies based in Tennessee
Williamson County, Tennessee
Retail companies of the United States